Rockbridge Inn is a historic inn and tavern located near Natural Bridge, Rockbridge County, Virginia. It was built between 1821 and 1823, and is a two-story, five-bay, brick building. A two-story frame wing was built in 1841. It was remodeled in the 1880s, with the addition of two-story porches and interior redecoration.  It operated as an inn until the 1930s.  The property was owned in the 1880s by Colonel Henry Parsons, owner of Natural Bridge.

It was listed on the National Register of Historic Places in 1995.

References

Drinking establishments on the National Register of Historic Places in Virginia
Hotel buildings on the National Register of Historic Places in Virginia
Hotel buildings completed in 1823
Buildings and structures in Rockbridge County, Virginia
National Register of Historic Places in Rockbridge County, Virginia
1823 establishments in Virginia